Yerra Narayanaswamy is an Indian politician. He was a Member of Parliament, representing Andhra Pradesh in the Rajya Sabha the upper house of India's Parliament as a member of the Telugu Desam Party.

References

Rajya Sabha members from Andhra Pradesh
Telugu Desam Party politicians
Living people
1931 births